Cardinal Burns is a British television sketch show starring Seb Cardinal (born 1973 or 1974) and Dustin Demri-Burns (born July 1978).
After a pilot on BBC Three, the first series began on 8 May 2012 on E4, before moving to Channel 4 for the second series in 2014.

Series 1 (2012) 
Recurring characters included The Office Flirt, a pair of Cockney cabbies, and a middle-class spoken word poet, alongside parodies of Banksy and "scripted reality" programmes such as The Hills and Made in Chelsea.

Ensemble cast members for this series were Bridget Christie, James Puddephatt, Ronnie Lushington, Aisling Bea, Fiona Button, Lucinda Dryzek, Jeff Wode, Simon Coombs, Ayuk Marchant, Clare Warde, William Hartley, Terence Maynard and Travis Oliver.

Series 2 (2014) 
Cardinal Burns was renewed by Channel 4 for a second series in September 2012. On 10 May 2013, Channel 4 confirmed that the show would move from E4. The second series began airing on 30 April 2014.

Awards 
 2012: British Comedy Awards, Cardinal Burns was nominated for "Best Comedy Breakthrough Artist", "Best New Comedy Programme", and won the "Best Sketch Show" award.
 2013: Broadcast Awards, Cardinal Burns won "Best Multichannel Programme" and "Best Comedy Programme"
 2013: Loaded LAFTA Awards, Cardinal Burns won for "Funniest TV Show"
 2013: BAFTA Nomination for "Best Comedy"

Reception 
The series received generally positive reviews. The Guardian praised the characters and performances and called the show "refreshing", The Independent on Sunday said the show was "sharply written [and] nicely paced", and Metro found it "original and funny".

References

External links 
 Cardinal Burns at Channel 4
 
 

2012 British television series debuts
2014 British television series endings
2010s British television sketch shows
Channel 4 sketch shows
English-language television shows
E4 (TV channel) original programming
Television series by Left Bank Pictures